Franny Moyle (born 1964) is a British television producer and author. Her first book Desperate Romantics: The Private Lives of the Pre-Raphaelites (2009) was adapted into the BBC drama serial Desperate Romantics by screenwriter Peter Bowker. Her second book, Constance: The Tragic and Scandalous Life of Mrs. Oscar Wilde was published in 2011 to critical acclaim. In 2016 she released Turner: The Extraordinary Life and Momentous Times of J.M.W. Turner, published by Viking. In 2021, her book, The King's Painter: The Life and Times of Hans Holbein, was published by Abrams Press in New York.

Career
Moyle is a graduate in English and the History of Art from St John's College, Cambridge. She joined BBC television in 1992 as a producer and director initially working predominantly in leisure programming as the editor of magazine programme Home Front. She became the BBC's Creative Director, Arts, running its in-house arts programming production department in London before being appointed the corporation's first dedicated Commissioner for Arts and Culture across its four channels. In 2005, she left a permanent role at the BBC to write and work as a freelance for her own projects. She continues to work as a Director of the Hackney Empire near her home in East London.

She is married to the television director and writer Richard Curson Smith and has three children.

References

External links
 http://www.capelland.com/pages/authors/index.asp?CID=168

1964 births
British television producers
British women television producers
Living people
Television people from London
Alumni of St John's College, Cambridge